George Edward Capers (September 2, 1892 – death date unknown) was an American Negro league outfielder in the 1910s.

A native of Charleston, South Carolina, Capers attended Howard University. In 1912, he played in the Negro leagues for the Cuban Giants, and played for the Philadelphia Giants in 1914.

References

External links
Baseball statistics and player information from Baseball-Reference Black Baseball Stats and Seamheads

1892 births
Year of death missing
Place of death missing
Cuban Giants players
Philadelphia Giants players